Captain Rascasse (French: Le capitaine Rascasse) is a 1927 French silent film directed by Henri Desfontaines and starring Gabriel Gabrio, Claude Mérelle and Jeanne Helbling.

Cast
 Gabriel Gabrio as 'Capitaine' Rascasse  
 Claude Mérelle as Madelon, la reine du whisky  
 Jeanne Helbling as Germaine Delaroche-Estève  
 Alice Tissot as Miss Waterbury  
 Paulette Berger as Paulette Samorède  
 Jean Devalde as Jean de Trégor  
 Joë Hamman as Curtius Salem  
 Pierre Hot as Delaroche-Estève  
 Mario Nasthasio as Rodriguez-Garcia  
 Paul Ollivier as Pablo Moralès  
 Pierre Denols as Trégor Père  
 Maurice Della Méa as Monsieur de Lérac  
 Albert Decoeur as Samorède 
 Engeldorff 
 Jim Gérald 
 Noëlle Mato 
 Jane Pierson 
 Cesar-Tullio Terrore

References

Bibliography 
 Dayna Oscherwitz & MaryEllen Higgins. The A to Z of French Cinema. Scarecrow Press, 2009.

External links 
 

1927 films
French silent films
1920s French-language films
French black-and-white films
Pathé films
Films directed by Henri Desfontaines
1920s French films